Corbon is a former commune in the Calvados department in the Normandy region in northwestern France. In January 2015 it merged with the commune of Notre-Dame-d'Estrées to the new commune Notre-Dame-d'Estrées-Corbon.

Population

See also
Communes of the Calvados department

References

Former communes of Calvados (department)
Calvados communes articles needing translation from French Wikipedia
Populated places disestablished in 2015